USS LST-355 was an  of the United States Navy active during the Second World War.

She was laid down in September 1942 at the Charleston Navy Yard, sponsored by Mrs. Wendell E. Kraft and commissioned in December 1942.

LST-355 first saw service at the invasion of Sicily in July 1943, and then at the Salerno landings in September. In 1944 she moved to England to support the Normandy landings, landing on Omaha Beach on D-Day.

Following the end of the war, she served on occupation duties in the Far East, before being decommissioned in March 1946 and sold for scrapping in April 1948 to Consolidated Builders in Seattle.

References
 
 

World War II amphibious warfare vessels of the United States
Ships built in Charleston, South Carolina
1942 ships
LST-1-class tank landing ships of the United States Navy